Alice Iyabo Ojo  (born 21 December 1977) is a Nigerian film actress,director, and producer. She has featured in over 150 films and has produced more than 14 of her own.

Early life
Iyabo Ojo was born as Alice Iyabo Ogunro on 21 December 1977 in Lagos, Nigeria, although her father was from Abeokuta, Ogun State. She was the youngest of three children, having two older brothers.

Education
She went to school in Lagos at National College, Gbagbada, before proceeding to study Estate Management at Lagos State Polytechnic.

Career
Having been involved in a drama group at secondary school, Iyabo Ojo commenced her acting career in 1998. She registered with the Actors Guild of Nigeria (AGN) with the help of  Bimbo Akintola, also able to network to  other people 

Ojo has scripted and featured in several Nigerian films. Her first role was in 1998's Satanic, an English-language film. In 2002, she made her Yoruba-language debut with Baba Darijinwon.  In January 2015, her film Silence, which features Joseph Benjamin Alex Usifo, Fathia Balogun, and Doris Simeon, premiered at the Silverbird Cinemas, Ikeja, in Lagos.

In 2004, Ojo started producing her own films. Her first production was Bolutife, after which she made Bofeboko, Ololufe, Esan and  Okunkun Biribiri.  She also divorced her husband before her fame started.

Personal life
Marrying a Lagos-based Clearing Agent in 1999, when she was 21, Iyabo took a break from pursuing her career. She gave birth to a son and then a daughter (born in 1999 and 2001 respectively), namely Felix Ojo and Priscilla Ajoke Ojo, but is now divorced from their father. She has attributed the breakup of her first marriage to marrying too young. She has spoken of her intention to stop using her former husband's surname, Ojo.

Pinkies Foundation
Iyabo Ojo launched her NGO, Pinkies Foundation, which caters to children with special needs and the less privileged, in May 2011. She celebrated the fifth anniversary of the foundation on 1 May 2016 at the R&A City Hotel, Ikeja, Lagos.

Activism
In April 2021, she strongly condemned fellow actor, Yomi Fabiyi for sympathising with Olanrewaju Omikunle (Baba Ijesha) who was arrested for molesting a minor. On 12 May 2021, she took legal action against Yomi Fabiyi (who had earlier staged a protest requesting the release of Baba Ijesha) for making "defamatory statements" about her. Her actions did not go down well with the Theater Arts and Motion Pictures Practitioners Association of Nigeria, (TAMPAN), and they blacklisted her on 28 June 2021. According to Legit.ng, actor Jide Kosoko, speaking for TAMPAN, said that Nollywood filmmakers under the association will stop working with her.

Selected filmography
Satanic (1998)
Agogo Ide (1998)
Baba Darinjinwon (2002)
Okanla (2013)
Silence (2015)
Beyond Disability (2015)
Black Val
Arinzo
Apo Owo
Awusa (2016)
Tore Ife (Love)
Trust (2016)
Ore (2016)
Ipadabo (2016)
Twisted Twin (2016)
Kostrobu (2017)
Gone to America (2017)
Divorce Not Allowed (2018)
The Real Housewives of Lagos (2022)
Mama Insurance
Beyond Disability (2014)
Egun (2007)
I believe (2018)
Gangan(2016)
Thin line (2018)
Smash 2018
The Alter date (2019)
Misquided (2019)
Fools' day (2021)
Under the carpet (2021)

Awards and nominations

See also
 List of Nigerian film producers
List of Yoruba people

References

Nigerian actresses
Actresses from Lagos
Lagos State Polytechnic alumni
1977 births
Living people
Nigerian TikTokers
Yoruba-language film directors
Yoruba actresses
Nigerian film directors
Nigerian film producers
Participants in Nigerian reality television series
Actresses in Yoruba cinema
Actresses from Ogun State
Nigerian philanthropists
Nigerian humanitarians